In algebraic geometry, a branch of mathematics, a Hilbert scheme is a scheme that is the parameter space for the closed subschemes of some projective space (or a more general projective scheme), refining the Chow variety. The Hilbert scheme is a disjoint union of projective subschemes corresponding to Hilbert polynomials. Hironaka's example shows that non-projective varieties need not have Hilbert schemes.

Hilbert scheme of projective space
The Hilbert scheme  of  classifies closed subschemes of projective space in the following sense: For any locally Noetherian scheme , the set of -valued points

The Hilbert scheme   breaks up as a disjoint union of pieces  corresponding to the Hilbert polynomial of the subschemes of projective space with Hilbert polynomial .

Construction as a determinantal variety
Grothendieck constructed the Hilbert scheme  of -dimensional projective  space as a subscheme of a Grassmannian defined by the vanishing of various determinants.

If  is a subscheme of -dimensional projective space, then  corresponds to a graded ideal  of the polynomial ring  in  variables, with graded pieces . Using the exact sequencewe have  has dimension , where  is the Hilbert polynomial of projective space. Note that we are using the equality of the Hilbert polynomial of a coherent sheaf with the Euler-characteristic of its sheaf cohomology groups.

The -dimensional space  is a subspace of the -dimensional space , so represents a point of the Grassmannian . This will give an embedding of the piece of the Hilbert scheme corresponding to the Hilbert polynomial  into this Grassmannian.

It remains to describe the scheme structure on this image, in other words to describe enough elements for the ideal corresponding to it. Enough such elements are given by the conditions that the map  has rank at most  for all positive , which is equivalent to the vanishing of various determinants. (A more careful analysis shows that it is enough just to take .)

Properties

Universality 
Given a closed subscheme  over a field with Hilbert polynomial , the Hilbert scheme  has a universal subscheme  flat over  such that

  is universal with respect to all flat families of subschemes of  having Hilbert polynomial . That is, given a scheme  and a flat family , there is a unique morphism  such that .

Tangent space 
The tangent space of the point  is given by the global sections of the normal bundle ; that is,

Unobstructedness of complete intersections 
For local complete intersections  such that , the point  is smooth.

Dimension of tangent space 

In addition to these properties,  determined for which polynomials the Hilbert scheme  is non-empty, and  showed that if  is non-empty then it is linearly connected. So two subschemes of projective space are in the same connected component of the Hilbert scheme if and only if they have the same Hilbert polynomial.

Hilbert schemes can have bad singularities, such as irreducible components that are non-reduced at all points. They can also have irreducible components of unexpectedly high dimension. For example, one might expect the Hilbert scheme of  points (more precisely dimension 0, length  subschemes) of a scheme of dimension  to have dimension , but if  its irreducible components can have much larger dimension.

Functorial interpretation 
There is an alternative interpretation of the Hilbert scheme which leads to a generalization of relative Hilbert schemes parameterizing subschemes of a relative scheme. This construction is functorial by taking pullbacks of families.

Representability for projective maps 
If the structure map  is projective, then this functor is represented by the Hilbert scheme constructed above. Generalizing this to the case of maps of finite type requires the technology of algebraic spaces developed by Artin.

Relative Hilbert scheme for maps of algebraic spaces 
In its greatest generality, the Hilbert functor is defined for a finite type map of algebraic spaces  defined over a scheme . Then, the Hilbert functor is defined as

sending T to 
.
This functor is not representable by a scheme, but by an algebraic space.

Examples of Hilbert schemes

Fano schemes of hypersurfaces 
One of the motivating examples for the investigation of the Hilbert scheme in general was the Fano scheme of a projective scheme. This is because lines on smooth surfaces have negative self-intersection.

Hilbert scheme of points 
Another common set of examples are the Hilbert schemes of -points of a scheme , typically denoted . For  there is a nice geometric interpretation where the boundary loci  describing the intersection of points can be thought of parametrizing points along with their tangent vectors. For example,  is the blowup  of the diagonal modulo the symmetric action.

Degree d hypersurfaces 

where the underlying ring is bigraded.

Hilbert scheme of curves and moduli of curves 
For a fixed genus  algebraic curve , the degree of the tri-tensored dualizing sheaf  is globally generated, meaning its Euler characteristic is determined by the dimension of the global sections, so
.
Using the Riemann-Roch formula, the associated Hilbert polynomial can be computed as
.
Then, the Hilbert scheme

parameterizes all genus g curves. Constructing this scheme is the first step in the construction of the moduli stack of algebraic curves. The other main technical tool are GIT quotients, since this moduli space is constructed as the quotient
,
where  is the sublocus of smooth curves in the Hilbert scheme.

Hilbert scheme of points on a manifold 
"Hilbert scheme" sometimes refers to the punctual Hilbert scheme of 0-dimensional subschemes on a scheme. Informally this can be thought of as something like finite collections of points on a scheme, though this picture can be very misleading when several points coincide.

There is a Hilbert–Chow morphism from the reduced Hilbert scheme of points to the Chow variety of cycles taking any 0-dimensional scheme to its associated 0-cycle. .

For  of dimension at least 3 the morphism is not birational for large : the Hilbert scheme is in general reducible and has components of dimension much larger than that of the symmetric product.

It is smooth.

The Hilbert scheme of  points on a surface is also smooth (Grothendieck). This was used by Mark Haiman in his proof of the positivity of the coefficients of some Macdonald polynomials.

The Hilbert scheme of a smooth manifold of dimension 3 or more is usually not smooth.

Hilbert schemes and hyperkähler geometry 
Hence  admits a holomorphic symplectic form. It was observed by Akira Fujiki (for ) and Arnaud Beauville that  is also holomorphically symplectic.

A holomorphically symplectic, Kähler manifold is hyperkähler, as follows from the Calabi–Yau theorem. Hilbert schemes of points on the K3 surface and on a 4-dimensional torus give two series of examples of hyperkähler manifolds: a Hilbert scheme of points on K3 and a generalized Kummer surface.

See also
Quot scheme
Castelnuovo–Mumford regularity
Matsusaka's big theorem
Moduli of algebraic curves
Moduli space
Hilbert modular surface
Siegel modular variety

References

 Reprinted in

Examples and applications 

 Bott's formula and enumerative geometry
 The Number of Twisted Cubics on a Quintic Threefold
 Rational curves on Calabi–Yau threefolds: Verifying mirror symmetry predictions

External links

Scheme theory
Algebraic geometry
Differential geometry
Moduli theory